Action Airpark  was a privately owned, public use ultralight airport in Dearborn County, Indiana, United States. As per FAA records, it was one nautical mile (2 km) northeast of the central business district of Hardenstown, Indiana. The airpark was near Hardinsburg, an unincorporated town in Lawrenceburg Township, near the cities of Greendale and Lawrenceburg.

Facilities and aircraft 
Action Airpark covered an area of 18 acres (7 ha) at an elevation of 465 feet (142 m) above mean sea level. It had one runway designated 2/20 with a turf surface measuring 1,577 by 100 feet (481 x 30 m).

For the 12-month period ending August 18, 1997, the airport had 436 aircraft operations, an average of 36 per month: 97% general aviation and 3% military. At that time there was one ultralight aircraft based at this airport.

See also 
 List of airports in Indiana

References

External links 
 Aerial image as of March 1999 from USGS The National Map
 Aeronautical chart at SkyVector

Defunct airports in Indiana
Airports in Indiana
Transportation buildings and structures in Dearborn County, Indiana
Ultralight aviation